Rhododendron yedoense (syn. Rhododendron poukhanense), the Korean azalea, is a species of flowering plant in the family Ericaceae, with a disjunct distribution in northern Myanmar, Yunnan province in China, South Korea, and northern Kyushu island of Japan. Hardy in USDA zones 4 through 9, it is recommended as a hedge, and has above average resistance to the root rot that often afflicts azaleas. Rhododendron yedoense f. poukhanense is a major parental contributor to many modern hybrid azaleas.

Subtaxa
The following forms are accepted:
Rhododendron yedoense f. poukhanense  – South Korea, northern Kyushu
Rhododendron yedoense f. yedoense – northern Myanmar, Yunnan

References

yedoense
Flora of Myanmar
Flora of Yunnan
Flora of South Korea
Flora of Japan
Plants described in 1886